Paraplatyptilia albiciliatus is a moth of the family Pterophoridae. It is found in North America (including California, Oregon, Alberta and British Columbia).

The larvae have been recorded feeding on Orthocarpus species.

References

Moths described in 1880
albiciliatus